Stuart Callaghan (born 20 July 1976) is a Scottish former footballer who played for several Scottish league clubs, mostly in the lower divisions, after starting out in the top level as a youth player with Heart of Midlothian. He also played in Finland for Finnairin Palloilijat on loan, and in Northern Ireland for Linfield.

Career
At Hearts, his most notable achievement was taking part in the semi-final of the 1996–97 Scottish League Cup, winning a penalty for his side in a 3–1 win over Dundee at Easter Road. However, he was not selected in the squad for the final in an era where only three substitutes were allowed.

Finding opportunities limited at Tynecastle Park, Callaghan had a season with Linfield and won the 1999–2000 League and League Cup with the Blues, before returning to Scotland, initially with Clydebank but quickly switching to Hamilton Academical where he won the country's lowest senior division in his first campaign (the only season endured at that level by the Accies in their history) and was involved in the first matches at the club's new stadium.

He later had spells with semi-professional clubs Alloa Athletic, Brechin City and Berwick Rangers, playing regularly for each and winning a rare promotion to the First Division with Brechin, before moving to down to the Junior grade in his mid-30s.

After retiring from playing, he took on a role as a youth football coach.

Honours
Linfield
Irish League: 1999–2000
Irish League Cup: 1999–2000

Hamilton Academical
Scottish Third Division: 2000–01

Brechin City
Scottish Second Division: 2004–05

References

External links
 London Hearts Supporters' Club profile
 Veikkausliiga historical statistics profile
 
 
 Bankies Archive profile

1976 births
Living people
Footballers from North Lanarkshire
Association football midfielders
Scottish footballers
Heart of Midlothian F.C. players
Clydebank F.C. (1965) players
Linfield F.C. players
NIFL Premiership players
Veikkausliiga players
FinnPa players
Hamilton Academical F.C. players
Alloa Athletic F.C. players
Brechin City F.C. players
Berwick Rangers F.C. players
Beith Juniors F.C. players
Scottish Premier League players
Scottish Football League players
Scottish Junior Football Association players
Scottish expatriate footballers
Expatriate footballers in Finland
Scottish expatriate sportspeople in Finland